Loots is both a given name and a surname. Notable people with the name include:

Loots Bosman (born 1977), South African cricketer
Fritz Loots (1917–2008), South African Special Forces officer
Jeff Loots (born 1970), American football player

Afrikaans-language surnames